Johang  is a Village Development Committee VDC in Gulmi District in the Lumbini Zone of Western  Nepal. At the time of the 2011 Nepal census it had a population of about 10000 living in 1509 individual households.

References

External links
UN map of the village development committee of Gulmi District

Populated places in Gulmi District